More Than Wonderful is a live album by Gospel singer Sandi Patti issued in 1983 on Impact Records. The album reached No. 2 on the Billboard Top Christian Albums chart. The track "More Than Wonderful" would win many accolades including a Grammy Award for Best Gospel Performance by a Duo or Group at the 26th Grammy Awards, winning both Patti and Larnelle Harris their first Grammys together and a Dove Award for Song of the Year for its writer Lanny Wolfe and the album would win Inspirational Album of the Year and Patti won both Female Vocalist and Artist of the Year at the 15th GMA Dove Awards in 1984. In 1985, the track "Upon This Rock" wins Song of the Year, given to its writers Gloria Gaither and Dony McGuire at the 16th GMA Dove Awards. The album was certified Gold in 1985 and Platinum in 1990 by the Recording Industry Association of America. In 1990, More Than Wonderful was re-issued on Word Records.

Track listing

Chart history

Radio singles

Certifications and sales

Accolades
GMA Dove Awards
1984 Female Vocalist of the Year
1984 Artist of the Year

Grammy Awards

References

1983 live albums
Sandi Patty albums
Impact Records albums
Word Records albums